The United States Steel Hour is an anthology series which brought hour-long dramas to television from 1953 to 1963. The television series and the radio program that preceded it were both sponsored by the United States Steel Corporation (U. S. Steel).

Theatre Guild on the Air
The series originated on radio in the 1940s as Theatre Guild on the Air. Organized in 1919 to improve the quality of American theater, the Theatre Guild first experimented with radio productions in Theatre Guild Dramas, a CBS series which ran from December 6, 1943 to February 29, 1944.

Actress-playwright Armina Marshall (1895–1991), a co-administrator of the Theatre Guild, headed the Guild's newly created Radio Department, and in 1945, Theatre Guild on the Air embarked on its ambitious plan to bring Broadway theater to radio with leading actors in major productions. It premiered September 9, 1945 on ABC with Burgess Meredith, Henry Daniell and Cecil Humphreys in Wings Over Europe, a play by Robert Nichols and Maurice Browne which the Theatre Guild had staged on Broadway in 1928–29.

Within a year the series drew 10 to 12 million listeners each week. Presenting both classic and contemporary plays, the program was broadcast for eight years before it became a television series.

Playwrights adapted to radio ranged from Shakespeare and Oscar Wilde to Eugene O'Neill and Tennessee Williams. Numerous Broadway and Hollywood stars acted in the series, including Ingrid Bergman, Ronald Colman, Bette Davis, Rex Harrison, Helen Hayes, Katharine Hepburn, Gene Kelly, Deborah Kerr, Sam Levene, Agnes Moorehead, Basil Rathbone and Mary Sinclair. One notable performance was John Gielgud as Hamlet, in an expanded 90-minute broadcast with Dorothy McGuire as Ophelia. Fredric March was heard in his only performance as Cyrano de Bergerac, a role he played neither onstage or onscreen. The series also featured the only radio broadcast of Rodgers and Hammerstein's flop musical, Allegro.

The radio series was broadcast until June 7, 1953, when U.S. Steel decided to move the show to television.

Television

The television version aired from October 27, 1953 to 1955 on ABC, and from 1955 to 1963 on CBS. Like its radio predecessor, it was a live dramatic anthology series. During its first season on television, the program alternated bi-weekly with The Motorola Television Hour.

By its final year in 1963, it was the last surviving live anthology series from the Golden Age of Television. It was still on the air during President John F. Kennedy's famous April 11, 1962 confrontation with steel companies over the hefty raising of their prices. The show featured a range of television acting talent, and its episodes explored a wide variety of contemporary social issues, from the mundane to the controversial.

Notable guest star actors included Martin Balsam, Tallulah Bankhead, Ralph Bellamy, James Dean, Dolores del Río, Keir Dullea, Andy Griffith, Dick Van Dyke, Rex Harrison, Celeste Holm, Sally Ann Howes, Jack Klugman, Sam Levene, Peter Lorre, Walter Matthau, Bennye Gatteys, Paul Newman, George Peppard, Suzanne Storrs, Albert Salmi, George Segal and Johnny Washbrook. Washbrook played Johnny Sullivan in The Roads Home in his first ever screen role. Griffith made his onscreen debut in the show's production of No Time for Sergeants, and would reprise the lead role in the 1958 big screen adaptation. In 1956–57, Read Morgan made his television debut on the Steel Hour as a young boxer in two episodes titled "Sideshow". Child actor Darryl Richard, later of The Donna Reed Show, also made his acting debut in the episode "The Bogey Man", which aired January 18, 1955. In 1960, Johnny Carson starred with Anne Francis in "Queen of the Orange Bowl".

Many notable writers contributed episodes, including Ira Levin, Richard Maibaum and Rod Serling. The program also broadcast one-hour musical versions of The Adventures of Tom Sawyer and The Adventures of Huckleberry Finn. The latter was broadcast on November 20, 1957, with a cast including Jimmy Boyd, Earle Hyman, Basil Rathbone, Jack Carson and Florence Henderson. Boyd had previously played Finn in the earlier telecast of The Adventures of Tom Sawyer.

Controversy
Rod Serling was not regarded as a controversial scriptwriter until he contributed to The United States Steel Hour, as he recalled in his collection Patterns (1957):
In the television seasons of 1952 and 1953, almost every television play I sold to the major networks was "non-controversial". This is to say that in terms of their themes they were socially inoffensive, and dealt with no current human problem in which battle lines might be drawn. After the production of Patterns, when my things were considerably easier to sell, in a mad and impetuous moment I had the temerity to tackle a theme that was definitely two-sided in its implications. I think this story is worth repeating.

The script was called Noon on Doomsday. It was produced by the Theatre Guild on The United States Steel Hour in April 1956. The play, in its original form, followed very closely the Till case in Mississippi, where a young Negro boy was kidnapped and killed by two white men who went to trial and were exonerated on both counts. The righteous and continuing wrath of the Northern press opened no eyes and touched no consciences in the little town in Mississippi where the two men were tried. It was like a cold wind that made them huddle together for protection against an outside force which they could equate with an adversary. It struck me at the time that the entire trial and its aftermath was simply "They’re bastards, but they’re our bastards." So I wrote a play in which my antagonist was not just a killer but a regional idea. It was the story of a little town banding together to protect its own against outside condemnation. At no point in the conception of my story was there a black-white issue. The victim was an old Jew who ran a pawnshop. The killer was a neurotic malcontent who lashed out at something or someone who might be materially and physically the scapegoat for his own unhappy, purposeless, miserable existence. Philosophically I felt that I was on sound ground. I felt that I was dealing with a sociological phenomenon—the need of human beings to have a scapegoat to rationalize their own shortcomings.

Noon on Doomsday finally went on the air several months later, but in a welter of publicity that came from some 15,000 letters and wires from White Citizens' Councils and the like protesting the production of the play. In news stories, the play had been erroneously described as "The story of the Till case". At one point earlier, during an interview on the Coast, I told a reporter from one of the news services the story of Noon on Doomsday. He said, "Sounds like the Till case." I shrugged it off, answering, "If the shoe fits..." This is all it took. From that moment on Noon on Doomsday was the dramatization of the Till case. And no matter how the Theatre Guild or the agency representing U.S. Steel denied it, the impression persisted. The offices of the Theatre Guild, on West 53rd Street in New York City, took on all the aspects of a football field ten seconds after the final whistle blew.

Awards
Theater Guild on the Air won a Peabody Award for drama in 1947. The United States Steel Hour won Emmys in 1954 for Best Dramatic Program and Best New Program. The following year it won an Emmy for Best Dramatic Series, and Alex Segal was nominated for Best Direction. It received eight Emmy nominations in 1956, then one nomination for the years 1957, 1959, and 1961. In 1962, the episode "The Two Worlds of Charlie Gordon" was nominated for the Hugo Award for Best Dramatic Presentation.

See also

Academy Award Theater
Author's Playhouse
The Campbell Playhouse
Cavalcade of America
CBS Radio Workshop
The Cresta Blanca Hollywood Players
Ford Theatre
General Electric Theater
Lux Radio Theatre
The Mercury Theatre on the Air
Playhouse 90
Screen Director's Playhouse
The Screen Guild Theater
Suspense

References

Further reading
 William L. Bird, Jr. "Better Living": Advertising, Media, and the New Vocabulary of Business Leadership, 1935–1955. Evanston, Illinois: Northwestern University Press, 1999.

Listen to

External links

Company Voice Advertising, Museum of Broadcast Communications
Jerry Haendiges Vintage Radio Logs: Theater Guild on the Air

"Writing for Television" by Rod Serling
The United States Steel Hour at CVTA with episode list
Theatre Guild United States Steel Hour records, 1956–1963, held by the Billy Rose Theatre Division, New York Public Library for the Performing Arts
Watch U.S. Steel Hour episodes at the UCLA Film and Television Archive

1953 American television series debuts
1963 American television series endings
1940s American radio programs
1950s American radio programs
1950s American anthology television series
American Broadcasting Company original programming
1950s American drama television series
1960s American drama television series
American radio dramas
Anthology radio series
American live television series
Black-and-white American television shows
CBS original programming
English-language television shows
Primetime Emmy Award for Outstanding Drama Series winners
U.S. Steel
NBC radio programs
ABC radio programs
CBS Radio programs
1960s American anthology television series